Elephants From Neptune is an Estonian rock band.

In 2017, the band won one award in Estonian Music Awards, namely, in the category "best band of the year".

Members
Robert Linna - vocals, guitars, keyboards
Markko Reinberg - guitars, lap steel, vocals
Rain Joona - bass
Jon Mikiver - drums, percussion.

Discography

Albums
2012 "Elephants From Neptune" (Birdeye Entertainment)
2014 "Pressure & Pleasure" (Birdeye Entertainment)	
2016 "Oh No" (Birdeye Entertainment)
2022 "Boogieland" (Roadhouse Records)

References

Estonian musical groups